Burkholderia pyrrocinia is a Gram-negative bacterium which has been found in soil as well as in the sputum of patients with cystic fibrosis.

References

External links
Type strain of Burkholderia pyrrocinia at BacDive -  the Bacterial Diversity Metadatabase

Burkholderiaceae
Bacteria described in 1997